Muhammet Arslantaş (born 27 January 2001) is a Turkish professional footballer who plays as a forward for İstanbul Başakşehir.

Professional career
Arslantaş is a youth product of the academies of Trakya Fenerspor, Bucaspor and İstanbul Başakşehir. On 4 January 2019, he signed his first professional contract with İstanbul Başakşehir. He made his professional debut with İstanbul Başakşehir in a 1–1 Süper Lig tie with Denizlispor on 8 December 2019. On 10 September 2020, he joined Boluspor on loan for the 2020-21 season in the TFF First League. His loan was cut short, and moved to Turgutluspor for the second half of the season on 30 January 2021. He spent the 2021-22 season on loan with Belediye Kütahyaspor, and had a prolific spell with 14 goals in 31 matches.

International career
Arslantaş is a youth international for Turkey, having played up to the Turkey U19s.

Honours
İstanbul Başakşehir
Süper Lig: 2019–20

References

External links
 
 

Living people
2001 births
People from Bayburt
Turkish footballers
Turkey youth international footballers
Association football forwards
Süper Lig players
TFF First League players
TFF Second League players
TFF Third League players
İstanbul Başakşehir F.K. players
Turgutluspor footballers